Bill Swan (born January 25, 1939) is a Canadian children's author living in Courtice, Ontario. He teaches writing-related courses online and works as a communications consultant. Bill Swan was college administrator and journalism professor at Durham College in Oshawa, Ontario. He was a newspaper editor and columnist. He spent one year at  Royal Military College of Canada in Kingston, Ontario.

Works
Fast Finish - 1998—
Mud Run - 2003—
Off Track! - 2003—
Corner Kick - 2004—
Deflection - 2004—
Mud Happens - 2006—
Road Rage - 2006—
The Enforcer - 2007—
Man-to-Man - 2009
Real Justice: Fourteen and Sentenced to Death - 2012

References

External links
Bill Swan bio

1939 births
Living people
Canadian children's writers
People from Clarington
Royal Military College of Canada alumni
Writers from Ontario